Maria Gloria Penayo de Duarte (née Solaeche, born 10 November 1962) is the former First Lady of Paraguay as the wife of Nicanor Duarte Frutos, President of Paraguay from 2003–2008. She is a convert to the Mennonites.

In 2005, she was nominated to be an ambassador of the United Nations Food and Agriculture Organization for that organism's alimentation world day. By 2010, she was one of the organization's ambassadors, along with others such as Pierre Cardin, Lea Salonga, Gong Li and Dionne Warwick.

References

1962 births
First Ladies of Paraguay
Living people
Paraguayan Mennonites
People from Coronel Oviedo
Christians in Paraguay